Alexandra Svetlitskaya (20 August 1971 – 23 January 2019) was a Russian footballer who played as a midfielder who represented Russia in the 1999 and 2003 World Cups.

She scored an equalizer against England in the 2001 European Championship.

References

1971 births
2019 deaths
Russian women's footballers
Russia women's international footballers
1999 FIFA Women's World Cup players
2003 FIFA Women's World Cup players
FIFA Century Club
CSK VVS Samara (women's football club) players
FC Lada Togliatti (women) players
FC Energy Voronezh players
Women's association football midfielders
Sportspeople from Almaty
Kazakhstani women's footballers
Kazakhstani football managers
Women's association football managers
BIIK Kazygurt players